Niko Bungert (born 24 October 1986) is a retired German footballer who played as a defender currently assistant coach of Laos national under-17 football team.  

He was also a member of the German U-21 team. He was part of the Schalke youth team that won the Youth DFB-Pokal in 2005.

References

External links
 

German footballers
Germany under-21 international footballers
1986 births
Living people
Bundesliga players
2. Bundesliga players
FC Schalke 04 players
1. FSV Mainz 05 players
1. FSV Mainz 05 II players
Kickers Offenbach players
Association football defenders
3. Liga players
Sportspeople from Bochum
Footballers from North Rhine-Westphalia